Bella Shaw is an American journalist and news presenter, known for her work on TV infomercials and prior work on CNN from 1984-1993 when her contract was not renewed.

Professional life
Shaw attended the University of Oklahoma, where she earned a degree in journalism while participating in the university's radio station, and began working at WKY Radio in 1976. There, she was a news presenter until being laid off when the station switched to FM format; however,  at that time, KTVY (now KFOR-TV) was located in the same building, and she began working there instead.

After seven years at KTVY, during which she was only given shifts on weekends, Shaw concluded that KTVY offered her no chance for career advancement, and applied to the then-nascent Cable News Network, on the grounds that "Ted Turner was hiring a lot of people from Oklahoma". Shaw's first day at CNN was July 12, 1984; although she had not been scheduled to appear on-camera that day, the regular news presenter was temporarily unavailable, and Shaw was chosen to report the news that Walter Mondale had selected Geraldine Ferraro as his running mate for the 1984 presidential election.

In 1989, she became the co-host of CNN's Showbiz Today, replacing Bill Tush; however, in 1993, CNN chose not to renew her contract, replacing her on Showbiz Today with Jim Moret, which Variety attributed to Moret being perceived as "more serious" than Shaw.

She subsequently joined Santa Clarita Valley local TV broadcasting with Time Warner Cable.

Today, Shaw anchors weekly for Torrance Citicable’s “COVID-19 Today”. This show airs daily  Monday-Thursday locally.

Personal life

Shaw was born in Austria, where her father was serving in the United States army, and raised in Fort Sill, Oklahoma.

She has twice been married: first to doctor Jim Hays, and later to banker Mark Soroko who died suddenly in March 2010.

Filmography

References

External links
Official site

University of Oklahoma alumni
Living people
American women journalists
CNN people
Year of birth missing (living people)
Place of birth missing (living people)
21st-century American women